Macrothemis is a genus of dragonfly in the family Libellulidae, also known as Sylphs. It contains the following species:

References

Libellulidae
Anisoptera genera
Taxa named by Hermann August Hagen